Middletown, Massachusetts may refer to:

Places

Middleton, Massachusetts in Essex County
Tisbury, Massachusetts, known as "Middletown" until 1671, in Dukes County